Linden School is a public school in Malden, Massachusetts, United States.

Linden School may also refer to:

 The Linden School, Toronto, Ontario, Canada
 Linden Lodge School for the Blind, Wimbledon, England
 Linden High School (disambiguation)

United States 
 Linden City Schools, Linden, Alabama
 Linden Community Schools, Genesee County, Michigan
 Linden Public Schools, Linden, New Jersey
 Linden Hall (school), Lititz, Pennsylvania
 Linden Avenue School, Pittsburgh, Pennsylvania
 Linden-Kildare High School, Linden, Texas

See also 
 Linden (disambiguation)
 Lynden High School, Lynden, Washington
 Lyndon School (disambiguation)